Ilya Gennadyevich Yurchenko (born 9 April 1996) is a Russian football player.

Club career
He made his debut in the Russian Professional Football League for FC Lokomotiv Liski on 11 August 2015 in a game against FC Vityaz Podolsk.

He made his Russian Football National League debut for FC Tekstilshchik Ivanovo on 7 July 2019 in a game against FC Yenisey Krasnoyarsk.

References

External links
 Profile by Russian Professional Football League

1996 births
People from Shakhty
Sportspeople from Rostov Oblast
Living people
Russian people of Ukrainian descent
Russian footballers
Association football forwards
FC Krasnodar players
FC Smena Komsomolsk-na-Amure players
FC Nosta Novotroitsk players
FC Tekstilshchik Ivanovo players
Russian First League players
Russian Second League players